This is a timeline of the Uzbeks.

15th century

16th century

17th century

18th century

19th century

20th century

See also
Shaybanids
Manghud

References

Bibliography

Turkic peoples of Asia
Ethnic groups in Uzbekistan